Maira Bravo Behrendt (born January 16, 1991) is a Brazilian rugby sevens player. She won a bronze medal at the 2015 Pan American Games as a member of the Brazil women's national rugby sevens team.

References

External links
 Maira Bravo Behrendt at BrasilRugby.com.br

1991 births
Living people
Brazil international rugby sevens players
Female rugby sevens players
Rugby sevens players at the 2015 Pan American Games
Pan American Games bronze medalists for Brazil
Pan American Games medalists in rugby sevens
Medalists at the 2015 Pan American Games
Brazilian female rugby union players
Brazil international women's rugby sevens players
Brazilian rugby sevens players
21st-century Brazilian women